Grüner may refer to:
 Grüner Veltliner
 Grüner IL
 Grüner See (Styria)
 Grüner Veltliner  variety of white wine grape
 George Grüner, Hungarian physicist

See also 
 Gruner (disambiguation)